Dinwiddie is an unincorporated community, census-designated place, and the county seat of Dinwiddie County, Virginia, United States.” It was first listed as a CDP in the 2020 census with a population of 619.

History
The town was the site of the Battle of Dinwiddie Court House, the Battle of Five Forks as well as the Battle of Sutherland's Station during the Appomattox Campaign.

Geography
The town is near the Interstate 85 corridor, about halfway between Richmond and the North Carolina State line.

Main sites
Burnt Quarter, the Dinwiddie County Court House, and Williamson Site are listed on the National Register of Historic Places.

References

External links

County seats in Virginia
Unincorporated communities in Dinwiddie County, Virginia
Unincorporated communities in Virginia
Census-designated places in Virginia